Uvinza Salt Works (Eneo la uchimbaji wa chumvi mawe ya Uvinza in Swahili ) are salt mines that have been in used since the Iron Age. The are numerous brine springs in the area.  The site is located in the town of Uvinza in  Uvinza District of Kigoma Region in Tanzania.

References

Kigoma Region